Donici is a commune in Orhei District, Moldova. It is composed of three villages: Donici, Camencea and Pocșești.

References

Communes of Orhei District